George Henry Rutherford (30 July 1875 – 6 February 1955) was an Australian rules footballer who played with St Kilda in the Victorian Football League (VFL).

References

External links 

1875 births
1955 deaths
Australian rules footballers from Victoria (Australia)
St Kilda Football Club players